Evan Green may refer to:
 Evan Green (journalist) (1930–1996), Australian motoring publicist, journalist, TV commentator, and novelist
 Evan Green (footballer) (born 1993), Gibraltarian footballer